The discography of Japanese pop and electronic dance group Perfume consists of seven studio albums, three compilation albums, twenty-eight singles and six video albums. Forming in 2001, the group debuted as local Hiroshima idols, releasing two singles through the independent Momiji Label. In 2003, the members moved to Tokyo to further their career as idols. Signing with independent label Bee-Hive Records, the group met electronic producer Yasutaka Nakata of the band Capsule, who began to produce their music from 2003 onward.

In 2005, the group made their major label debut under Tokuma Japan Communications with the single "Linear Motor Girl", and in 2007 broke through into the mainstream Japanese market with the single "Polyrhythm", their first Oricon chart top ten release. The band's resulting debut studio album Game (2008) was a great success, becoming certified double platinum by the Recording Industry Association of Japan. After releasing the albums Triangle (2009) and JPN (2011), featuring the commercially successful songs "Love the World" (2008), "Dream Fighter" (2008), "One Room Disco" (2009) and "Voice" (2011), Perfume parted with Tokuma Japan, signing with Universal Music Japan in order to pursue global markets.

Studio albums

Compilation albums

Extended plays

Box sets

Singles

As lead artist

As a featured artist

Promotional singles

Video albums

Live concerts

Music video collections

Documentary film

Comedy skits

Music videos

Songs

Live performances

Other appearances

Notes

References

Discographies of Japanese artists
Pop music group discographies
Electronic music discographies
Discography